Clandestine is a 1982 crime novel by American author James Ellroy. Set in 1951, the protagonist is ambitious LAPD Officer Fred Underhill. Ellroy dedicated Clandestine, "to Penny Nagler".

Underhill is a young cop on the rise working out of the Wilshire station. He covers the beat with his partner Herbert Lawton "Wacky" Walker, a World War II veteran with a Medal of Honor, a drinking problem, and an obsession with death. Underhill and Walker discover the mutilated and strangled corpse of a young secretary. The trail leads to other murders, new and old, and a beautiful crippled district attorney named Lorna Weinberg.

Several characters from Ellroy's later L.A. Quartet series first appear here, including police lieutenant Dudley Smith, Michael Breuning, and Richard Carlisle.

Clandestine earned Ellroy an Edgar Award nomination from Mystery Writers of America in 1982.

References

1982 American novels
Novels by James Ellroy
American crime novels
Novels set in the 1950s
Novels set in Los Angeles
Avon (publisher) books